USS Penguin has been the name of three United States Navy ships:

 , a steamer purchased at New York on 23 May 1861 which served in the U.S. Navy until 1865.
 , a minesweeper laid down 17 November 1917 at the New Jersey Dry Dock and Transportation Co., Elizabethport, New Jersey which served in the U.S. Navy from 1918 to 1941.
 , a submarine rescue vessel laid down as USS Chetco (AT-99) by the Charleston Shipbuilding and Dry Dock Co., Charleston, South Carolina, 9 February 1943, and commissioned in 1944.

References 

United States Navy ship names